Kissenger (also spelled Kissinger) is an unincorporated community in Pike County, in the U.S. state of Missouri.

History
A post office called Kissenger was established in 1879, and remained in operation until 1919. The community has the name of James Henley , the original owner of the town site.

References

Unincorporated communities in Pike County, Missouri
Unincorporated communities in Missouri